Bisht may refer to:  

Bisht (surname), an Indian and Nepali surname
Bisht (clothing), a traditional Arab men's cloak